Manthyrea was a village in ancient Arcadia, in the territory of Tegea. An image of the goddess Athena that Pausanias describes seeing at Tegea came from Manthyrea.

Its site is unlocated.

References

Populated places in ancient Arcadia
Former populated places in Greece
Lost ancient cities and towns